The 1961 Oswestry by-election was held on 9 November 1961. It was held due to the incumbent Conservative MP and Minister of State for Foreign Affairs, David Ormsby-Gore becoming the British Ambassador to Washington.  The by-election was won by the future Conservative cabinet minister John Biffen, then aged 31.

Candidates
The local Liberals selected 36 year old John Buchanan. He was born in July 1925 and was educated at Collyer's School, Horsham. He was standing for parliament for the first time.

Result

References

By-elections to the Parliament of the United Kingdom in Shropshire constituencies
Oswestry by-election
Oswestry by-election
20th century in Shropshire
Oswestry by-election